This is the list of international prime ministerial trips made by Benjamin Netanyahu as Prime Minister of Israel.

First term (1996–1999)

Second term (2009–2013)

Third term (2013–2015)

Unconfirmed

Fourth term (2015–2020)
Since May 14, 2015, Netanyahu heads the thirty-fourth government of Israel, acting both as Prime Minister and Minister of Foreign Affairs.

Unconfirmed

Fifth term (2020–2021)

Sixth term (2022–present)

Notes

References

1990s politics-related lists
2000s politics-related lists
2010s politics-related lists
2020s politics-related lists
Diplomatic visits by heads of government
Lists of diplomatic visits by heads of state
Israeli prime ministerial visits
Israel history-related lists
Trips